"Dream on the Dancefloor" is a song by Swedish musician Basshunter, which appears on his fifth studio album, Calling Time.

Track listing
 Digital download (18 November 2012)
 "Dream on the Dancefloor" (Radio Edit) – 3:12
 "Dream on the Dancefloor" (Extended Mix) – 4:54
 "Dream on the Dancefloor" (Hi Def Radio Edit) – 3:01
 "Dream on the Dancefloor" (Hi Def Remix) – 5:12
 "Dream on the Dancefloor" (Rudedog Radio Edit) – 2:53
 "Dream on the Dancefloor" (Rudedog Remix) – 5:10

 Digital download (12 February 2013)
 "Dream on the Dancefloor" (Radio Edit) – 3:11
 "Dream on the Dancefloor" (Hi Def Radio Edit) – 3:01
 "Dream on the Dancefloor" (Rudedog Radio Edit) – 2:53
 "Dream on the Dancefloor" (Extended Mix) – 4:54
 "Dream on the Dancefloor" (Hi Def Remix) – 5:12
 "Dream on the Dancefloor" (Hi Def Dub Mix) – 5:12
 "Dream on the Dancefloor" (Rudedog Remix) – 5:09
 "Dream on the Dancefloor" (Rudedog Instrumental Mix) – 5:04

Music video 
Music video was directed by Gareth Evans and uploaded by All Around the World on 28 September 2012.

Live performances 
Basshunter performed "Dream on the Dancefloor" in 2011 at Youth Beatz, which was witnessed by around 11,000 spectators. The artist also performed the song on 12 May 2012 at Maspalomas Pride 2012, where his performance was recorded and released in a box set among various artists.

Charts

Release history

References

External links
 

Songs about dreams
Songs about dancing
Songs about parties
Basshunter songs
2012 singles
2012 songs
All Around the World Productions singles
Songs written by Scott Simons
Songs written by Basshunter
Eurodance songs
Song recordings produced by Basshunter